Alfonso Teofilo Brown (July 5, 1902 – April 11, 1951), better known as Panama Al Brown, was a Panamanian professional boxer. He made history by becoming boxing's first Latin American world champion, and is widely regarded as one of the greatest bantamweight boxers in history.

Brown won the NYSAC and lineal bantamweight titles in 1929 after defeating Gregorio Vidal. In 1930, he won both the NBA and IBU bantamweight titles, after defeating Johnny Erickson and Eugène Huat. After relocating to Paris, France, Brown became known within the gay nightlife of the time for his flamboyant lifestyle and his interest in the arts, performing in a cabaret.

As an Afro-Panamanian in the US, Brown faced racial barriers throughout his boxing career, and had been stripped of the NYSAC and NBA titles by 1934. He held the IBU title until 1935, when he lost it to Baltasar Sangchili.

In 1938, Brown fought for the IBU bantamweight title again in a rematch with Sangchili, winning on points. He continued to box until 1942, but failed to achieve the same level of success he had previously enjoyed. In 2002, Brown was named one of the 80 best fighters of the past 80 years by The Ring magazine. He currently ranks #5 in BoxRec's ranking of the greatest bantamweight boxers in history. He has been inducted into the International Boxing Hall of Fame.

Early life
Alfonso Teofilo Brown was born on July 5, 1902, to Afro-Caribbean immigrants in the City of Colón, Panama. His father, Horace Brown, died when Brown was 13, and his mother, Esther Lashley, worked as a cleaner. His first exposure to boxing came while working as a young adult clerk for the United States Shipping Board, at the Panama Canal Zone, witnessing American soldiers boxing.

Professional career

Early career
Brown turned professional in 1922 under the guidance of manager Dave Lumiansky. His first fight took place on March 19, 1922, when he beat Jose Moreno by a decision in six at Colon. By his seventh fight, December 13 of that same year, he beat Sailor Patchett by a fifteen-round decision, to earn the Panamanian 'Isthmus' flyweight title.

On September 22, 1923, he had his first fight abroad, drawing in four rounds with Johnny Breslin, in New York. He very quickly established a presence upon relocating to the city in 1923. His rise was rapid; a year after his move to New York, The Ring magazine rated him the third best flyweight in the world; two years later, the sixth best bantamweight.

Brown began campaigning extensively across the United States before he suffered his first loss, at the hands of Jimmy Russo on December 6, 1924, by decision in twelve. He would later avenge that defeat, and he beat Davey Abad and Willie LaMorte before being disqualified in the first round against Frankie Murray on June 11, 1925. Despite that setback, he kept on campaigning successfully, fighting for the first time in his career at Madison Square Garden on May 21, 1926, against Teddy Silva. Brown won with a third-round knockout. On October 14, 1928, he was listed as the National Boxing Association (NBA) bantamweight champion. On November 10 of that year, he knocked out Antoine Merlo in his Paris debut, at the Salle Wagram.

He enjoyed Paris so much that he decided to stay there for the rest of his life. In Paris he trained under Eugene Bullard who served as a fighter pilot in World War I.  He became a hugely popular boxer in France, and fought on the European continent 40 times between 1929 and 1934. Over the next three years, he beat several fighters there, including former world champion Eugene Criqui.

An interesting case happened when he fought Gustav Humery, on January 29, 1929. Brown and Humery had previously agreed that they would not salute by touching gloves before the fight, and when the bell rang, Brown struck quickly, breaking Humery's jaw with his first punch and sending him to the floor. With the referee's count of ten seconds, the fight lasted a total of fifteen seconds, one of the quickest knockouts in boxing history.

World bantamweight champion
On June 18, 1929, Brown made history by becoming the world's first Latin American world champion. He beat Gregorio Vidal by a fifteen-round decision to win the vacant NYSAC and lineal bantamweight titles, at the Queensboro Stadium, Long Island. He became a national idol in Panama, and an instant celebrity almost everywhere else in Latin America. Magazines such as Ring En Español were still talking about his achievement sixty years later. Soon after he lost a ten-round, non-title fight to Battling Battalino. On February 8, 1930, Brown beat Johnny Erickson by disqualification to claim the NBA bantamweight title. On October 4, 1930, he beat Eugène Huat by unanimous decision to claim the IBU bantamweight title.

On July 30, 1933, Brown defended his IBU title against British bantamweight champion Johnny King, at Kings Hall, Manchester. Brown knocked King down several times during the early rounds, though King fought on. During the seventh round King caught Brown with a right, almost knocking him out, but Brown managed to hold on for a points decision.

On February 19, 1934, Brown defended his IBU title against Young Perez at the Palais des Sports, Paris, in what would be the first of three encounters between the two boxers. Brown had a significant height and reach advantage, and proved too much for the Tunisian, who lost on points. Shortly after the NBA stripped Brown of his title for failing to defend it against their leading contender Rodolfo Casanova.

Brown retained his title nine times and had countless other fights before a rematch with Humery that ended in disaster: on May 17, 1934, Brown was disqualified in round six at Paris for using illegal tactics. A riot started and Brown suffered several broken bones and was sent into semi-unconsciousness by fans before the police could help him. Twenty minutes later, the locale where the rematch was held had almost been entirely destroyed.

For his next title defense, on November 1 of the same year, he travelled to Tunis, for his second encounter with Young Perez. Perez was counted out in round ten while on the floor, claiming that Brown had hit him with an illegal blow.

On June 1, 1935, Brown lost the title to Baltasar Sangchili by a fifteen-round decision, at the Plaza de Toros, in Valencia, Spain. After the loss he chose to retire from boxing, instead performing in a cabaret. Suffering from the prolonged effects of drug use, he was persuaded by Jean Cocteau to detox, receiving treatment at the Sainte-Anne Asylum, and begin training for a comeback to boxing. His first fight was against former French bantamweight champion Andre Regis, at the Salle Wagram, Paris, on September 21, 1937. Brown achieving a first-round knockout. He had a rematch with Sangchili on March 4, 1938, avenging his earlier loss with a fifteen-round decision to win the vacant IBU bantamweight title, but by this time the International Boxing Union was no longer recognized in the United States. His rematch win over Sangchili is believed to be his last great night, and, bowing to Cocteau's wishes, Brown vowed to retire after one more fight. That came in 1939 against Valentin Angelmann in Paris, Brown stopped him in eight rounds.

Later career
With the advent of the World War II, Brown moved to the United States, settled in Harlem and tried to find work of the cabaret sort he performed in Paris when not fighting. There was none and before long he was fighting again, but not well.

Brown went on fighting until 1942, challenging unsuccessfully for the Panamanian Featherweight title on September 30, 1942, when he drew with Leocadio Torres, but retiring as a winner, defeating Kid Fortune by a decision in ten rounds on December 4 of the same year.

Not long after, he was arrested for using cocaine and deported for a year. He went back to New York afterward and, in his late 40s, took a lot of beatings while serving as a sparring partner for up-and-comers at a gym in Harlem, making a dollar a round.

Brown died penniless of tuberculosis in New York City in 1951. He had fainted on 42nd Street. The police thought he was drunk and took him to the station. Eventually he was transferred to Sea View Hospital. He died there on April 11, unaware that not long before, one of the newspapers in Paris had begun talks about organizing a fund drive to pay for his trip home.

During five years of investigation, Spanish painter Eduardo Arroyo wrote a biography of Panama Al Brown, titled Panama Al Brown, 1902-1951, first published by Edition Jean-Claude Lattès, Paris, in 1982.

Panama Al Brown's final record is believed to have been 123 wins, 18 defeats and 10 draws, with 55 knockouts, placing him in the exclusive list of boxers who have won 50 or more wins by knockout. He was the recognized bantamweight world champion for six years and over that time made 10 title defenses against 8 different contenders, the best bantamweights and featherweights of his era.

Personal life
Brown quickly fell in love with Paris, and as a result spent much of his life there. He was noted for dressing elegantly, and enjoyed the night life of the city, frequenting bars and jazz clubs. Brown was gay and was involved in a long-term romantic relationship with Jean Cocteau. He owned a number of cars including a 1929 Packard 645 Sport, and several Bugatti's. He joined Josephine Baker's La Revue Nègre as a tap-dancer, and made his cabaret debut as a song-and-dance man at the Caprice Viennoise.

During the early 1930s, Brown contracted syphilis, and suffered from sores on his back. He recovered well enough to continue his boxing career, though without antibiotics it remains unknown as to what extent he overcame the infection.

Professional boxing record
All information in this section is derived from BoxRec, unless otherwise stated.

Official record

All newspaper decisions are officially regarded as “no decision” bouts and are not counted in the win/loss/draw column.

Unofficial record

Record with the inclusion of Newspaper decisions in the win/loss/draw column.

See also

List of bantamweight boxing champions

References

Bibliography

External links
 
Panama Al Brown - CBZ Profile

|-

|-

 Stripped

|-

 

|-

 Stripped

|-

 https://titlehistories.com/boxing/wba/wba-world-b.html
 https://titlehistories.com/boxing/na/usa/ny/nysac-b.html
 https://titlehistories.com/boxing/eu/ebu/ibu-b.html
 https://boxrec.com/media/index.php/The_Ring_Magazine%27s_Annual_Ratings:_Bantamweight--1930s

1902 births
1951 deaths
International Boxing Hall of Fame inductees
20th-century deaths from tuberculosis
Sportspeople from Colón, Panama
Panamanian male boxers
Panamanian expatriate sportspeople in the United States
Panamanian expatriates in France
Panamanian people of African descent
Tuberculosis deaths in New York (state)
Bantamweight boxers
LGBT boxers
Panamanian LGBT sportspeople
Gay sportsmen
20th-century LGBT people